Creston District AVA is an American Viticultural Area located in the south east portion of the Paso Robles AVA in San Luis Obispo County, California. It is located in the vicinity of the small community of Creston, California. It was established by the Alcohol and Tobacco Tax and Trade Bureau in 2014.

History
The Creston District AVA was created in 2014 by the division of the Paso Robles AVA into 11 distinct areas. Notable vineyards in the new AVA include Chateau Margene, Parrish Vineyard, Creston Vineyard 85 and B & E Vineyard.

Geography and climate
The Creston District AVA covers 46,794 acres with 1,365 planted in vineyards. It lies on an old erosional plateau at the base of the La Panza Range with alluvial terraces and fans of Huerhuero Creek.

Viticulture
The district's soils consist of old, well developed terrace and hillside soils; mix of granite and sedimentary rock.

Grape varieties and wine
The most widely planted varieties in the Creston District AVA are Cabernet Sauvignon, Syrah, Zinfandel, Merlot, Petite Sirah.

References

American Viticultural Areas
American Viticultural Areas of California
Wine regions
San Luis Obispo County, California
Wineries in California
Paso Robles, California
2014 establishments in California